Secrets of Life is a 1956 American documentary film written and directed by James Algar. The documentary follows the changing world of nature, the sky, the sea, the sun, planets, insects and volcanic action. The documentary was released on November 6, 1956, by Buena Vista Distribution.

Synopsis
The fourth in Walt Disney's True-Life Adventures series, the 1956 film Secrets of Life features previously rarely-seen film footage of nature's "behind-the-scenes" goings-on that play a huge role in making the planet what it is. From bees to ants and the flora and fauna surrounding us, Secrets of Life reveal a sometimes startling glimpse into nature's wonders that we often take for granted. Accompanied by musical selections, the metamorphosis of air-borne seeds into glorious plants and flowers is shown with the help of time-lapse photography.

Bees are seen as they go about the non-stop business of pollination, giving adage to the saying "busy as a bee". Ants are shown in their various classifications, from workers to warriors to the regal "queen". Countless protozoa are viewed in a single drop of water as the voice-over describes their role in the "big picture" of unseen nature.

The close-ups provide an intimacy which gives these oft-neglected organisms a "face".

Awards
 1957 Berlin Film Festival: Golden Bear (Best Documentary)

References

External links
 

1956 films
Disney documentary films
Walt Disney Pictures films
American documentary films
1956 documentary films
Films directed by James Algar
Documentary films about nature
Films produced by Ben Sharpsteen
Films scored by Paul Smith (film and television composer)
1950s English-language films
1950s American films